Henry Källgren (13 March 1931 – 21 January 2005) was a Swedish footballer who played at both professional and international levels as a striker.

Career

Club career
Källgren played club football for IFK Norrköping between 1951 and 1960, scoring a total of 126 goals in 181 games.
In 1960 Källgren made an controversial move to Norrby IF where he played for 3 seasons before retiring from football in 1963.

International career
Källgren represented the national team at the 1958 FIFA World Cup, and earned a total of eight caps between 1953 and 1958.

References

External links
 
 PlayerHistory.com

1931 births
2005 deaths
Swedish footballers
Sweden international footballers
1958 FIFA World Cup players
IFK Norrköping players
Allsvenskan players
Association football forwards
Sportspeople from Norrköping
Footballers from Östergötland County